Two Ways to Fall is the second studio album released by American country music artist Ty England. His second and final album for the RCA Nashville label, it produced the singles "Irresistible You" and "All of the Above", which peaked at #22 and #46, respectively, on the Billboard Hot Country Singles & Tracks (now Hot Country Songs) charts. "I'll Take Today" was originally recorded by Tanya Tucker on her 1994 album Fire to Fire, and would later be released as a single by Gary Allan from his 1998 album It Would Be You.

Track listing

Personnel
Mike Brignardello — bass guitar
Larry Byrom — acoustic guitar
Mark Casstevens — acoustic guitar
Joe Chemay — bass guitar
Dan Dugmore — steel guitar
Glen Duncan — fiddle
Ty England — lead vocals
Larry Franklin — fiddle
Sonny Garrish — steel guitar
Dann Huff — electric guitar
Paul Leim — drums
Brent Mason — electric guitar
Steve Nathan — piano
Gary Prim — piano
Michael Rhodes — bass guitar
Joe Spivey — fiddle
Dennis Wilson — background vocals
Lonnie Wilson — drums
Curtis Wright — background vocals
Curtis Young — background vocals

Chart performance

References

1996 albums
Ty England albums
RCA Records albums
Albums produced by Byron Gallimore
Albums produced by James Stroud